Sigifredo Ochoa Pérez (2 April 1942 – 6 January 2023) was a Salvadoran military officer and politician.

Biography 
Sigifredo Ochoa Pérez was born in El Salvador on 2 April 1942. He was a colonel in the Salvadoran Army during the Salvadoran Civil War. According to declassified documents from the Central Intelligence Agency (CIA), Ochoa allegedly was a commanding officer of the El Calabozo massacre which killed over 200 people in 1982.

As a member of the right-wing Nationalist Republican Alliance (ARENA), Ochoa served as El Salvador's ambassador to Honduras under President Antonio Saca from 2005 to 2009. Ochoa was dismissed from his position by President Mauricio Funes after he accepted an award from the Honduran government which deposed President Manuel Zelaya, which Funes' government did not recognize at the time. He later served as a deputy of the Legislative Assembly from 2012 to 2015. He later left the party and joined Salvadoran Democracy (DS).

In June 2022, he was sentenced to 8 years imprisonment for misappropriating USD$41,040 while being an ambassador.

Ochoa died in a traffic accident in San Juan Opico on 6 January 2023, at the age of 80.

References 

1942 births
2023 deaths
Nationalist Republican Alliance politicians